Nixon v. Fitzgerald, 457 U.S. 731 (1982), was a US Supreme Court case that dealt with immunity from prosecution of government officials performing discretionary functions when their actions did not violate clearly-established law.

Background
Arthur Ernest Fitzgerald filed a lawsuit against government officials that he had lost his position as a contractor for the US Air Force because of testimony made before Congress in 1968. Among the people listed in the lawsuit was ex-President Richard Nixon, who argued that a president cannot be sued for actions taken while he is in office.

The trial court and the appellate court rejected Nixon's claim of immunity. The case was then appealed to the Supreme Court.

Opinion
In a 5–4 decision, the Court ruled that the President is entitled to absolute immunity from legal liability for civil damages based on his official acts. The Court, however, emphasized that the President is not immune from criminal charges stemming from his official or unofficial acts while he is in office.

The Court noted that a grant of absolute immunity to the President would not leave him with unfettered power. It stated that there were formal and informal checks on presidential action that did not apply with equal force to other executive officials.

The Court observed that the President was subjected to constant scrutiny by the press and noted that vigilant oversight by Congress would also serve to deter presidential abuses of office and to make the threat of impeachment credible. It determined that other incentives to avoid presidential misconduct existed, including the desire to earn re-election, the need to maintain prestige as an element of presidential influence, and the traditional concern for his historical stature.

The decision was clarified by Clinton v. Jones, in which the Court held that a President is subject to civil suits for actions committed before he assumes the presidency.

See also
 List of United States Supreme Court cases, volume 457

References

Further reading

External links

1982 in United States case law
Richard Nixon
United States Constitution Article Two case law
United States Supreme Court cases
United States Supreme Court cases of the Burger Court